Antilly is the name of the following communes in France:

 Antilly, Moselle, in the Moselle department
 Antilly, Oise, in the Oise department